Matthew Ebden was the defending champion but chose not to compete.

John Millman won the title, defeating Kyle Edmund in the final, 6–4, 6–4.

Seeds

Draw

Finals

Top half

Bottom half

References
 Main Draw
 Qualifying Draw

2014 ATP Challenger Tour
Keio Challenger
2014 Keio Challenger